Raesetja Jane Sithole is a South African politician.  She has been serving as a Member of the Mpumalanga Provincial Legislature since May 2014. Sithole is also the Provincial Leader of the Mpumalanga Democratic Alliance.

Education
Sithole achieved a BA Degree in Communications from the University of South Africa. Sithole also holds a National Diploma (T3) in Office Administration from the Tshwane University of Technology. She also obtained a Diploma in Political Leadership and Governance from the Wits School of Governance. She further obtained a Post Graduate Diploma in Political Leadership and Governance from the Wits School of Governance. Sithole also obtained a Management Development Programme (MDP) certificate from the Graduate School of Management at the University of Pretoria. She also obtained a Senior Management Programme (SMP) certificate from the Graduate School of Management at the University of Pretoria.

Political career
Sithole joined the Democratic Alliance, previously known as the Democratic Party, in 1999. Sithole had served as a councillor of both the Emalahleni Local Municipality and the Nkangala District Municipality from 2000 until 2014. Sithole served as Chief Whip of Emalahleni Caucas from 2007 up to 2014.

She was elected to the Mpumalanga Provincial Legislature in 2014 and was appointed to the position of Chief Whip of the Democratic Alliance caucus. In the fifth provincial legislature (2014–2019), she sat on the Public Works & Transport, Community Safety, Security & Liaison, Health, and Social Development committees in the legislature. She currently sits on the Health and Social Development, and Education, Culture, Sport and Recreation committees.

Before being elected Provincial Leader, Sithole served as Provincial Chairperson for the Association of Democratic Alliance Councillors (ADAC) from 2005 to 2011. Sithole was elected to the position of Provincial Deputy Leader in 2012 until 2015. In 2015 Sithole was elected to the position of Provincial Chairperson of the party. Sithole was elected unopposed as the Provincial Leader of the Democratic Alliance in Mpumalanga on 3 March 2018, succeeding James Masango.

On 20 September 2018, Sithole was announced as the Democratic Alliance's Mpumalanga Premier candidate for the 2019 election.

In the May 2019 election, the Provincial Democratic Alliance lost its official opposition status to the Economic Freedom Fighters, though the party did manage to retain all three of its seats in the provincial legislature.

Sithole was re-elected unopposed as provincial leader in October 2020. She supported interim DA leader John Steenhuisen's campaign to become leader of the party for a full term at the party's Federal Congress.

Sithole was re-elected to another term as the party's provincial leader at the provincial congress in February 2023.

Sithole is the Leader of the Democratic Alliance Caucas in the Mpumalanga Provincial Legislature since 2018.

References

External links
People's Assembly profile
Profile on Twitter

|-

Women members of provincial legislatures of South Africa
Living people
Democratic Alliance (South Africa) politicians
21st-century South African women politicians
21st-century South African politicians
Year of birth missing (living people)
Members of the Mpumalanga Provincial Legislature